Octonoba sinensis is a species of cribellate orb weaver in the spider family Uloboridae. It is found in China, Korea, Japan, and has been introduced into the United States.

References

Uloboridae
Articles created by Qbugbot
Spiders described in 1880